The 2011–12 season of the División de Honor de Waterpolo was the 89th season of top-tier water polo in Spain.

Atlètic-Barceloneta won their twelfth División de Honor title.

Teams

Final standings

Source:

Top goal scorers

References

External links
 Real Federación Española de Natación

División de Honor de Waterpolo
Seasons in Spanish water polo competitions
Spain
2011 in water polo
2012 in water polo
2011 in Spanish sport
2012 in Spanish sport